Smuggler's House is a historic house in Swansea, Massachusetts.  It is a -story Cape style farmhouse, five bays wide, with a side gable roof, a chimney that is slightly off-center, and a pair of gabled dormers.  Its main entry is flanked by pilasters and topped by a five-light transom window.  The house was built c. 1800, and is substantially unaltered.  It was supposedly used as a place to store smuggled goods during the War of 1812.

The house was listed on the National Register of Historic Places in 1990.

See also
National Register of Historic Places listings in Bristol County, Massachusetts

References

Houses in Bristol County, Massachusetts
Swansea, Massachusetts
Houses on the National Register of Historic Places in Bristol County, Massachusetts